Euphorbia otjipembana is a species of plant in the family Euphorbiaceae. It is endemic to Namibia.  Its natural habitat is subtropical or tropical dry shrubland.

References

Endemic flora of Namibia
otjipembana
Vulnerable plants
Taxonomy articles created by Polbot